Ashlyn Martin (20 March 1946 – 24 October 1991) was the stage name of Laura Lynn Hale, a model and actress who was Playboy magazine's Playmate of the Month for its April 1964 issue. She was born in Dayton, Ohio.

Career
Her centerfold was photographed by Pompeo Posar and Mario Casilli. She also appeared in the July 1963 issue of Playboy in The Bunnies, a pictorial, as well as in a photograph dated 1960 (along with Playmate/Bunny Patti Reynolds) in The Bunny Years (page 56) by Kathryn Leigh Scott. In the January 1966 Issue of Playboy she appeared in the Playboy Mansion Pictorial along with Allison Parks (starting on page 105). In The Playmate Book, Hugh Hefner says that Laura's pseudonym was inspired by a character in the Ernest Hemingway novel The Sun Also Rises, most likely Brett Ashley.

She also worked as a Bunny at the Chicago Playboy Club.

Filmography
 Blood Feast (1963) .... Marcy
 Beach Party (1963) .... Surfer (uncredited)
 Burke's Law - "Who Killed Alex Debbs?" (1963) (as Laura Lynn Hale) .... 2nd Deb Girl
 Muscle Beach Party (1964) .... Beach girl

References

External links

1946 births
1991 deaths
Actresses from Dayton, Ohio
1960s Playboy Playmates
21st-century American women